Mossend International Railfreight Park (previously known as Mossend Railhead) is a freight-handling station in Mossend, Scotland. It is situated across the line from the Mossend EuroTerminal.

History 
Plans to expand the facility were rejected by North Lanarkshire Council in 2014, but the decision was overturned by Scottish ministers the following year. The council subsequently challenged the decision at the Court of Session, where in 2016 the judge ruled in its favour, stating that the Scottish ministers had not given adequate reasoning for overturning the original decision to reject the project.

In 2018, the facility was re-branded as the Mossend International Railfreight Park.

The first phase of the expansion project was approved by the local council in May 2021.

Future 
There are plans to expand the facility. Once complete, the facility will operate 24 hours per day and be capable of handling 16 trains each day.

Operation
The facility is operated by Peter D. Stirling Ltd.

References

External links 
 Mossend International Railfreight Park website

Transport in North Lanarkshire
Rail yards in the United Kingdom
Bellshill
Rail transport in Scotland